Nakhon Thai may refer to:
 Nakhon Thai District
 Nakhon Thai Subdistrict